GC Motorsports International (formerly Go Canada Racing) was a NASCAR racing team based in Ontario, Canada, owned by Canadian businessman Steve Meehan. 

Meehan founded GCMI in the spring of 2011, the result of his desire to bring together his interest in racing with his talent for business. The team was formed when Meehan bought the No. 27 NASCAR Nationwide Series team that had previously competed under both the names Brewco Motorsports and Baker Curb Racing. 

In 2012, GC Motorsports International partnered with Dave Jacombs Racing to launch a two-car effort in the NASCAR Canadian Tire Series and form a subsidiary team GC Motorsports Canada.

NASCAR Nationwide Series

2011

When the team was formed, GCMI initially hired Canadian J. R. Fitzpatrick to drive the car, but he left the team after a few races. After the departure, J. J. Yeley was brought to drive the No. 27 car for several races to start and park the car. The car returned to the number 67 when Canadian Andrew Ranger drove for the team at Loudon and Homestead.

2012
2012 began with David Ragan, last season's winner of the Coke Zero 400 in the NASCAR Sprint Cup Series, behind the wheel of car No. 27 at Daytona. Ragan qualified 23rd and finished 26th. He also took part in the O'Reilly Auto Parts 300 at Texas, qualifying 30th and finishing 6th. Andrew Ranger competed in a number of Nationwide races including the series' only Canadian race, the Napa Auto Parts 200 at Montreal. He qualified 12th and finished 32nd. He also competed at Homestead and finished 28th. This was the team's last start and has not been heard from since.

NASCAR Canadian Tire Series

2012

The team launched an effort in the NASCAR Canadian Tire Series with two cars anchored by two time series champion Andrew Ranger.

External links
 GC Motorsports International (GCMI)
 GC Motorsports International (GCMI) Twitter
 GC Motorsports International (GCMI) Facebook

References

http://nationwide.nascar.com/nationwide-series/news/110419/go-canada-racing-jfitzpatrick-debut/

Auto racing teams established in 2011
Defunct NASCAR teams
2011 establishments in Ontario
Auto racing teams disestablished in 2012
2012 disestablishments in Ontario